Jan ("Joop") Leendert van Dort (25 May 1889 in Heemstede – 1 April 1967 in Leiden) was a football player from the Netherlands, who represented his home country at the 1920 Summer Olympics. There he won the bronze medal with the Netherlands national football team.

Club career
He played over 200 games for Ajax and joined Vitesse in 1922.

International career
Van Dort made his debut for the Netherlands in an April 1920 friendly match against Denmark and obtained a total number of five caps, scoring no goals.

References

External links
Dutch Olympic Committee 
Profile at Stats.sv-vitesse.nl 

1889 births
1967 deaths
People from Heemstede
Association football forwards
Dutch footballers
Netherlands international footballers
Olympic medalists in football
Medalists at the 1920 Summer Olympics
Footballers at the 1920 Summer Olympics
Olympic footballers of the Netherlands
Olympic bronze medalists for the Netherlands
AFC Ajax players
SBV Vitesse players
Dutch football managers
SBV Vitesse managers
Footballers from North Holland